Kerala Socialist Party (KSP) is a political party in India founded under the leadership of Mathai Manjooran on 21 September 1947 at Kozhikode. It began as a small party, but its front-line leaders compelled the party deep into the public  imagination. The party became part of the coalition that formed the first democratically elected communist government in the world after San Marino.

Within the short time span of two decade and a half of its coming into existence KSP came to play a larger-than-life role in the political landscape of the post-independence Kerala State.

Among its founding members other than Mathai Manjooran were John Manjooran, M.T. Lazar, N. Sreekantan Nair, M.P. Menon (who later went on to become a Judge of the High Court of Kerala), K. Balakrishnan (son of the veteran Congress leader C. Kesavan), K.C.K.M. Mather, P. K. Balakrishnan, K.R. Chummar, G. Janardhana Kurup, T.P. Chakrapani, A.P. Pillai to name only some of the prominent leaders. 

In 1949 October, within 2 years of its inception the party underwent a split and N. Sreekantan Nair, Baby John and K. Balakrishnan joined the Revolutionary Socialist Party, then a small socialist party confined to Bengal.

It was one among the seven parties that came together to form the United Front coalition government in Kerala under the chief ministership of E.M.S. Namboodiripad in 1967 to 1969.

It won only one seat in the 1970 Kerala Legislative Assembly election, which it contested within a new alliance led by the Communist Party of India (Marxist), no longer as part of the reconstituted United Front (initially known as the "Mini Front") which ruled Kerala for 1970–1979. 

Other prominent leaders of the KSP were as follows:
 Mamman Kannanthanam
 Cherian Manjooran
 Varkey Unnikkunnel
 Baby John
 M.L. George
 P. Sankarankutty
 S.S. Das
 K.G. Nath
 Karunakara Menon
 A. Damodaran
 C.N. Sreekandan Nair
 C.S. Gangadharan
 Prakkulam Bhasi
 Thakazhi Sivasankara Pillai
 C. Vivekanandan.
 Sadananda Shastri
 L.G. Pai
 T.K. Divakaran
 U. Neelakhandan

Important members and fellow travellers of the KSP:
 Pozhamangalath George alias P P Varuthukutty (Secretary, Tata Employees Union)
 M.K. Menon (Vilasini)
 K. M. Ro

References

Sources
Kaalathinu Munpae Nadanna Manjooran by K.M. Roy
Keraleeyathayum Mattum (Published by D.C. Books)_ by P. K. Balakrishnan.

Defunct political parties in Kerala
Political parties in Travancore–Cochin
Defunct socialist parties in India
Political parties established in 1947
1947 establishments in India